Peter Ulbrich (born 17 August 1955) is a German fencer. He competed in the individual and team sabre events for East Germany at the 1980 Summer Olympics.

References

1955 births
Living people
German male fencers
Olympic fencers of East Germany
Fencers at the 1980 Summer Olympics
Sportspeople from Chemnitz